Brezov is a village and municipality in Bardejov District in the Prešov Region of north-east Slovakia.

History
In historical records the village was first mentioned in 1335.

Geography
The municipality lies at an altitude of 190 metres and covers an area of 6.894 km2.
It has a population of about 435 people.

Genealogical resources

The records for genealogical research are available at the state archive "Statny Archiv in Presov, Slovakia"

 Roman Catholic church records (births/marriages/deaths): 1840-1902 (parish A)
 Greek Catholic church records (births/marriages/deaths): 1839-1935 (parish B)

See also
 List of municipalities and towns in Slovakia

External links
 
 
https://web.archive.org/web/20071116010355/http://www.statistics.sk/mosmis/eng/run.html
Surnames of living people in Brezov

Villages and municipalities in Bardejov District
Šariš